Vasilică Mihai Gușu (born 24 December 1996) is a Romanian professional footballer who plays as a defender for Serie C club AlbinoLeffe.

Career

AlbinoLeffe
In July 2017, Gușu joined Serie C club AlbinoLeffe. He made his competitive debut for the club on 27 August 2017, coming on as a 75th-minute substitute for Fausto Coppola in a 1-0 defeat to Südtirol. He scored his first goal for the club as part of a brace later that season, scoring in the 16th and 27th minutes of a 3-1 victory over Feralpisalò.

Career statistics

Club

References

External links

Living people
People from Rădăuți
Romanian emigrants to Italy
1996 births
Romanian footballers
Association football defenders
U.C. AlbinoLeffe players
Carrarese Calcio players
Serie C players
Serie D players
Romanian expatriate footballers
Romanian expatriate sportspeople in Italy
Expatriate footballers in Italy